"Ghosts" is a 2020 single by American rock band Bruce Springsteen and the E Street Band. The song was released as the second single for Springsteen's then forthcoming album Letter to You on September 24, 2020. A music video for the single was also released.

Description
It has been described as a song about the "beauty and joy of being in a band and the pain of losing one another to illness and time". Besides being a salute to lost bandmates and a love letter to rock, Rolling Stone describes "Ghosts" as a probable future live favorite when concerts resume, and sounding like a "revved-up version of rockers from The River, such as "Two Hearts".

Release history

Charts

References

2020 songs
Bruce Springsteen songs
Songs written by Bruce Springsteen
Song recordings produced by Ron Aniello
2020 singles
Song recordings produced by Bruce Springsteen
American hard rock songs